Meryl L. Frank is an American politician, non-profit executive, diplomat, and author.

Education 
Frank earned a Bachelor of Arts degree in history from Rutgers University, followed by a Master of Arts in political science, Master of Arts in international relations, and Master of Public Health from Yale University.

Career
Frank helped author legislation for President Bill Clinton, including the Family and Medical Leave Act of 1993, and New Jersey Governor Thomas Kean. She was the mayor of Highland Park, New Jersey from 2000 to 2010.

In 2009, President Barack Obama appointed Frank to represent the United States to the Fifth World Conference on Women. In 2010, Obama appointed her ambassador to the United Nations Commission on the Status of Women.

In 2015, Variety reported that Frank had been named the executive director of FilmAid. In January 2022, Frank was appointed to serve as a member of the United States Holocaust Memorial Council.

In 2023, Hachette Books will publish Frank's memoir of searching for the history of her family lost in the Holocaust, Unearthed: A Lost Actress, a Forbidden Book, and a Search for Life in the Shadow of the Holocaust.

References

Mayors of places in New Jersey
People from Highland Park, New Jersey
Living people
Place of birth missing (living people)
Year of birth missing (living people)
Women mayors of places in New Jersey
21st-century American women